This is a list of major aviation accidents and incidents that took place in Iran, or involved aircraft traveling to and from Iran.

References